The Jephson Baronetcy, of Spring Vale in the County of Dorset, was a title in the Baronetage of the United Kingdom.  It was created on 1 June 1815 for Richard Jephson.  The title became extinct on the death of the fourth Baronet in 1900.

Jephson baronets, of Spring Vale (1815)
Sir Richard Mounteney Jephson, 1st Baronet (1765–1824)
Sir Richard Mounteney Jephson, 2nd Baronet (died 1870)
Sir James Saumerez Jephson, 3rd Baronet (1802–1884)
Sir Stanhope William Jephson, 4th Baronet (1810–1900)

References

Extinct baronetcies in the Baronetage of the United Kingdom